In Greek mythology, Pentheus was a king of Thebes. His father was Echion, the wisest of the Spartoi. His mother was Agave, the daughter of Cadmus, the founder of Thebes, and the goddess Harmonia. His sister was Epeiros.

Much of what is known about the character comes from the interpretation of the myth in Euripides' tragic play, The Bacchae.

Mythological biography
The story of Pentheus' resistance to Dionysus and his subsequent punishment is presented by Euripides as follows. 
Cadmus, the king of Thebes, abdicated due to his old age in favour of his grandson Pentheus.  Pentheus soon banned the worship of the god Dionysus, who was the son of his aunt Semele, and forbade the women of Cadmeia to partake in his rites. 
An angered Dionysus caused Pentheus' mother Agave and his aunts Ino and Autonoë, along with all the other women of Thebes, to rush to Mount Cithaeron in a Bacchic frenzy. Accordingly, Pentheus imprisoned Dionysus, thinking the man simply a follower, but his chains fell off and the jail doors opened for him.

Dionysus lured Pentheus, disguised as a woman, out to spy on the Bacchic rites, where Pentheus expected to see sexual activities. The daughters of Cadmus saw him in a tree and thought him to be a wild animal.  They pulled Pentheus down and tore him limb from limb (as part of a ritual known as the sparagmos).  When his true identity was later discovered, officials exiled the women from Thebes. Some say that his own mother was the first to attack him, tearing his arm off and then tearing off his head. She placed the head on a stick and took it back to Thebes, but only realized whose head it was after meeting her father Cadmus.

The name "Pentheus", as Dionysus and Tiresias both point out, means "Man of Sorrows" and derives from πένθος, pénthos, sorrow or grief, especially the grief caused by the death of a loved one.  His name appeared to mark him for tragedy. Pentheus was succeeded by his uncle Polydorus.

Before or possibly after Pentheus was killed, his wife gave birth to a son named Menoeceus, who became the father of Creon and Jocasta.  He became the grandfather of Oedipus.

The story of Pentheus is also discussed by Ovid in his Metamorphoses (3. 511–733). Ovid's version diverges from Euripides' work in several areas. In Ovid's Metamorphoses, King Pentheus is warned by the blind seer Tiresias to welcome Bacchus or else "Your blood [shall be] poured out and defile the woods and your mother and her sisters..." Pentheus dismisses Tiresias and ignores his warnings. As Thebes succumbs to the "dementia and the delirium of the new god", Pentheus laments the fall of his kingdom and demands the arrest of Bacchus. His guards instead arrest Acoetes of Maeonia, a sailor who confirms the divinity of Bacchus and tells how the crew of his ship ended up being turned into dolphins after trying to kidnap the young god.

Pentheus, convinced that Acoetes is lying, tries to throw him in jail, but when the guards try to shackle Acoetes, the chains fall off. In a rage, Pentheus ran to deal with Bacchus himself. He charged through the woods straight into a Bacchanalia. Driven to a frenzy the participants thought Pentheus was a boar and attacked him. His mother was the first one to spear him and then the group tore his flesh apart with their bare hands.

Family tree of Theban Royal House

References
Euripides, The Tragedies of Euripides translated by T. A. Buckley. Bacchae. London. Henry G. Bohn. 1850. Online version at the Perseus Digital Library.
Euripides, Euripidis Fabulae. vol. 3. Gilbert Murray. Oxford. Clarendon Press, Oxford. 1913. Greek text available at the Perseus Digital Library.

Publius Ovidius Naso, Metamorphoses translated by Brookes More (1859-1942). Boston, Cornhill Publishing Co. 1922. Online version at the Perseus Digital Library.
Publius Ovidius Naso, Metamorphoses. Hugo Magnus. Gotha (Germany). Friedr. Andr. Perthes. 1892. Latin text available at the Perseus Digital Library.

External links

Theban kings
Kings in Greek mythology
Theban characters in Greek mythology
Dionysus in mythology